A consumer is person or group that uses products.

Consumer or Consumers may also refer to:
 Consumer (food chain), an organism that lives off other organisms
 Consumers Distributing, a retail store chain
 The Consumers, a punk rock band active from 1977 to 1978